Tonight with Boy Abunda (also known as TWBA) was a Philippine late-night talk show aired by ABS-CBN, hosted by Boy Abunda. The program premiered on September 28, 2015, and airs every weeknights from 10:55PM to 11:10PM on the network's Primetime Bida evening block. It also airs worldwide via TFC.

It serves as a transitional show after Kris Aquino's departure from their previous show Aquino & Abunda Tonight citing schedule conflicts, political reality and health reasons. The show eventually did not go back on-air as Boy Abunda returned to GMA Network on December 15, 2022 and it was replaced by The World Tonight on Kapamilya Channel and Balitang A2Z on A2Z on its timeslot.

Format
Similar to its predecessor, the show gives a run-down of daily top stories with topics raging from showbiz, lifestyle, homosexuality and politics, with the promise to deliver its segments "from layman's point of view", and with perspectives on how certain issues can affect viewers' daily lives.

Host

 Boy Abunda

Segments
 Life Line
 Hot Seat
 Fast Talk
 Golden Mirror
 5 in 45
 T.M.I. The Main Issue
 The A List
 The TWBA Test: Tama o Mali
 2 Be Honest
 Sinong Guilty?
 POPster Quiz
 Legit or Lie

Production
From March 16, 2020, until May 4, 2020, due to the Luzon enhanced community quarantine caused by the COVID-19 pandemic in the Philippines, Tonight with Boy Abunda temporarily suspended production of its new episodes and temporarily aired re-runs until the temporary closure of ABS-CBN because of the cease and desist order of the National Telecommunications Commission (NTC), following the expiration of the network's 25-year franchise granted in 1995. However, the current status of the talk show remained unknown until it was eventually cancelled after Abunda's return to GMA Network.

References

ABS-CBN original programming
Entertainment news shows in the Philippines
Philippine television talk shows
2015 Philippine television series debuts
2020 Philippine television series endings
Late night television programming
Filipino-language television shows